Bhanu Uday is an Indian film and television actor, best known for his role of Aryan Khanna, in STAR One's television series, Special Squad.

He played the role of Dr. Karan in Sony Pal's show Hamari Sister Didi. He was also seen as Rajaram Gaikwad in &TV's show Meri Awaaz Hi Pehchaan Hai.

Early life and family

Bhanu Uday, born on 16 October 1980, was brought up in Jammu. His father is former Union Home Secretary and IAS officer Anil Goswami and his mother is a lawyer. He received his primary education from Jammu and passed his 12th standard. After that he moved to Delhi and joined Hans Raj College. Later he joined National School of Drama passing out in 2004 and started acting.

He married actress Shalini Khanna in 2014, and their son was born in March 2016.

Career 
Bhanu played small roles in Bollywood films like Lakshya (2004) and Dhokha (2007). He acted in the Indo-US production Unfreedom, where he played Hussain. He was seen in the 2012 horror film, Machhli Jal Ki Rani Hai.

He is best known for playing the role of Aryan Khanna, Assistant Commissioner of Police and leader of Special Squad group in Star One's Special Squad.

He also acted in the television series named Har Kadam Par Shaque (Series named Specials @ 10), aired on Sony Entertainment Channel, Rusty in Doordarshan series Ek Tha Rusty (2012).

Filmography

Films

Television

References

External links

Indian male television actors
Indian male film actors
Male actors in Hindi cinema
Male actors from Jammu and Kashmir
People from Jammu
1980 births
Living people